Hörnerkirchen is an Amt ("collective municipality") in the district of Pinneberg, in Schleswig-Holstein, Germany. It is situated approximately 12 km northeast of Elmshorn. The seat of the Amt is in Brande-Hörnerkirchen.

The Amt ("collective municipality") Hörnerkirchen consists of the following municipalities (population in 2005 between brackets):

Bokel (634) 
Brande-Hörnerkirchen (1.626) 
Osterhorn (443) 
Westerhorn (1.310)

Ämter in Schleswig-Holstein